The PDSA Dickin Medal was instituted in 1943 in the United Kingdom by Maria Dickin to honour the work of animals in World War II. It is a bronze medallion, bearing the words "For Gallantry" and "We Also Serve" within a laurel wreath, carried on a ribbon of striped green, dark brown, and pale blue. It is awarded to animals that have displayed "conspicuous gallantry or devotion to duty while serving or associated with any branch of the Armed Forces or Civil Defence Units". The award is commonly referred to as "the animals' Victoria Cross".

Maria Dickin was the founder of the People's Dispensary for Sick Animals (PDSA), a British veterinary charity.  She established the award for any animal displaying conspicuous gallantry and devotion to duty whilst serving with British Empire armed forces or civil emergency services.  The medal was awarded 54 times between 1943 and 1949 – to 32 pigeons, 18 dogs, 3 horses, and a ship's cat – to acknowledge actions of gallantry or devotion during the Second World War and subsequent conflicts.

The awarding of the medal was revived in 2000. In December 2007, 12 former recipients buried at the PDSA Animal Cemetery in Ilford, Essex, were afforded full military honours at the conclusion of a National Lottery-aided project to restore the cemetery.

Recipients
The first recipients of the award, in December 1943, were three pigeons serving with the Royal Air Force who contributed to the recovery of aircrews from ditched aircraft. The most recent recipient is Hertz, a German shorthaired pointer who served with the RAF Police in Afghanistan.

, the Dickin Medal has been awarded 74 times, plus one honorary award made in 2014 to all the animals who served in the First World War.

A ^ Rob was awarded the Dickin Medal in 1945 for taking part in more than 20 parachute drops and for his involvement in operations behind enemy lines in Italy and North Africa during the Second World War. There is evidence that his record is a hoax concocted by the training officer at 2nd SAS at the time so that the dog would remain with the regiment.
B ^ The German Shepherd Dog breed was renamed in the UK by The Kennel Club in 1919 to Alsatian Wolf Dog. During the 1920s, the Wolf Dog part of the name fell out of use and dogs of this breed were simply known as Alsatians. The name had been reverted in most countries by 1977 to German Shepherd Dog.

See also 

Animals
 Swansea Jack (1930–1937) – twice decorated by the National Canine Defence League before the introduction of the Dickin Medal
 List of individual dogs

Honouring animals
 Animals in War Memorial – commemorating the countless animals that have served and died under British military command throughout history
 PDSA Gold Medal – an equivalent of the Dickin Medal for civilian animals
 Purple poppy – a symbol of remembrance in the United Kingdom for animals that served during wartime
 Animals in War & Peace Medal of Bravery – an American award patterned after the Dickin Medal, first awarded in 2019

Animals in war
 Dogs in warfare – the history and work done by duty dogs
 Horses in warfare – the history and work done by duty horses

Animals assisting veterans
 Bravehound – Scottish charity that supports former servicemen, women and their families, providing training and dogs to support veterans
 Hounds for Heroes – British charity helping train and provide service dogs to wounded British Armed Forces and Emergency Services men and women

References
General

Specific

External links 

 
 
  A documentary about pigeons involved in the Second World War, many of whom won the Dickin Medal
  Images of Beauty, Rip, Jet, Rex and Irma

Military animals
Awards established in 1943
Awards to animals
Lists of animals
Military awards and decorations of World War II